The 2019 Hobart International was a women's tennis tournament played on outdoor hard courts. It was the 26th edition of the Hobart International and was part of the WTA International tournaments of the 2019 WTA Tour. It took place at the Hobart International Tennis Centre in Hobart, Australia from 7 to 12 January 2019.

The singles was won by unseeded American Sofia Kenin who took home her first WTA title after defeating Anna Karolína Schmiedlová from Slovakia in straight sets. In the doubles it was Taiwanese pair in Chan Hao-ching and Latisha Chan who won in three sets over their opponents in Kirsten Flipkens and Johanna Larsson.

Points and prize money

Point distribution

Prize money

1 Points per the WTA.
2 Qualifiers prize money is also the Round of 32 prize money
* per team

Singles main-draw entrants

Seeds

1 Rankings as of 31 December 2018.

Other entrants
The following players received wildcards into the singles main draw:
  Caroline Garcia
  Zoe Hives
  Ellen Perez

The following players received entry from the qualifying draw:
  Alison Bai
  Anna Blinkova
  Magda Linette
  Greet Minnen
  Laura Siegemund
  Heather Watson

The following players received entry as lucky losers:
  Madison Brengle
  Kateryna Kozlova

Withdrawals
Before the tournament
  Eugenie Bouchard → replaced by  Anna Karolína Schmiedlová
  Rebecca Peterson → replaced by  Ana Bogdan
  Alison Riske → replaced by  Madison Brengle
  Magdaléna Rybáriková → replaced by  Evgeniya Rodina
  Wang Yafan → replaced by  Kateryna Kozlova

WTA doubles main-draw entrants

Seeds 

1 Rankings as of 31 December 2018

Other entrants 
The following pairs received wildcards into the doubles main draw:
  Alison Bai /  Annerly Poulos 
  Zoe Hives /  Ellen Perez

Withdrawals 
During the tournament
  Dalila Jakupović (viral illness)

Champions

Singles

  Sofia Kenin def.  Anna Karolína Schmiedlová, 6–3, 6–0

Doubles

  Chan Hao-ching /  Latisha Chan def.  Kirsten Flipkens /  Johanna Larsson, 6–3, 3–6, [10–6]

References

External links
Official website

 
Hobart International
Hobart International
Hobart International
Hobart International